Leverella is a genus of parasitic flies in the family Tachinidae. There are at least two described species in Leverella.

Species
These two species belong to the genus Leverella:
 Leverella institutiimperialis Baranov, 1934
 Leverella novaeguineae Baranov, 1934

References

Further reading

 
 
 
 

Tachinidae
Articles created by Qbugbot
Taxa named by Nikolay Ilyich Baranov